Romanian–Turkish relations are foreign relations between Romania and Turkey. The two countries maintain longstanding historical, geographic, and cultural relations. Romania has an embassy in Ankara and two consulates-general in Istanbul and İzmir. Romania also has four honorary consulates in Turkey in İskenderun, Edirne, Trabzon and Eskişehir. Romania also has a cultural institute The Romanian Cultural Institute "Dimitrie Cantemir". Turkey has an embassy in Bucharest and a consulate-general in Constanţa. Turkey also has two honorary consulates in Cluj Napoca and Iași. Both countries are full members of NATO, the BLACKSEAFOR and BSEC.

High level visits
 President Ahmet Necdet Sezer visited Romania between July 8–9, 2004.
 President Traian Băsescu visited Turkey between September 28–29, 2005.
 Prime Minister Recep Tayyip Erdoğan visited Romania between October 24–26, 2007.
 Prime Minister Călin Popescu-Tăriceanu visited Turkey between February 1–2, 2006.
 Minister of Foreign Affairs Lazăr Comănescu visited Turkey on April 19 and 20 November 2003.
 Head of the Parliament Bogdan Olteanu visited Turkey between November 7–9, 2007.
 Speaker of the Parliament Koksal Toptan visited Romania between November 27–30 May 2008.

Resident diplomatic missions
 Romana has an embassy in Ankara and consulates-general in Istanbul and Izmir.
 Turkey has an embassy in Bucharest and a consulate-general in Constanța.

See also 
 Foreign relations of Romania
 Foreign relations of Turkey 
 Turks of Romania
 Grand Mosque of Bucharest

External links 
 Turkish Ministry of Foreign Affairs about relations with Romania
 Romanian Ministry of Foreign Affairs about relations with Turkey (Romanian)

 
Turkey
Bilateral relations of Turkey